The 2015 European Diving Championships was held from 9–14 June 2015 in Rostock, Germany. A total of eleven disciplines were contested.

Medalists
The complete list of results and medals was published by the LEN (LIGUE EUROPÉENNE DE NATATION)

Results

Green denotes finalists

See also 
2015 European Diving Championships

References 

2015 European Diving Championships
Euro